Baringo South is a constituency in Kenya. It is one of six constituencies in Baringo County.

References 

Constituencies in Baringo County